Mohamed Abdelfattah (born February 4, 1978, in Suez, Egypt), commonly known by his nickname "Bogy", is an Egyptian Olympic Greco-Roman wrestler who competed in 76 kg, 84 kg, and 96 kg weight class. He is a 2006 world champion, 3 time World Medalist, and 3 time Olympian. After retiring as a player, Bogy became coach of Sweden National Team, and in his first season 2009 he successfully guided Jimmy Lidberg to win a silver medal and Jalmar Sjöberg to win a bronze medal  in the 2009 world championship in Denmark.

After 2004 Athens Olympic games Bogy was a resident athlete at the United States Olympic Training Center work close with coach Jakob Panotas part of usa team under the Special Athletes Program for individuals with extraordinary ability and achievement. He  won a  gold medal in  2006 World Wrestling Championships the same year the United States Greco-Roman team was second tied with Russia. The following year, The United States Greco-Roman team went on to win the 2007 world championship in Azerbaijan for the first time in history for the United states Wrestling. After proving he had a great talent in the sport of wrestling not just as an athlete but as a Coach USA Wrestling announced Bogy would join the USA Greco-Roman technical coach.

As a Coach, Bogy won 6 trophies in the first four years of his coaching career. He is one of the most successful coaches in the world and is considered by a number of Wrestlers, Coaches and commentators to be one of the best coach in the world.

Early life
Bogy was born in Suez. He is the elder of four children—four boys. His Father was a Soccer Coach who has dedicated his entire life to athletic excellence and discipline. Bogy started wrestling at the age of Six at the Elsamad Club in Suez. his Father friend was the coach of Elsamad Wrestling Club He spotted Bogy Watching professional Wrestling and imitating move, he asked him if he would want to come to practice he did and notice all of His neighborhood friends all wrestling in same club.

In 1995, he was spotted by Yehia Kazarian, then head coach of the Egyptian national Graeco Roman team. Kazarian found in Bogy everything he had been looking for: his height, his build, his skills, all promised a world and Olympic champion. Bogy joined the national team that same year.

2011 World Championship
Ranked fifth in 96kg category, Abdelfattah is the only African who succeeded to get its qualification ticket for the 2012 Olympic games.

2000 Olympics

2004 Olympics

Pool 2

Major international achievements
 2012 Summer Olympics - 13th - 2012
 World Championship in Istanbul - 5th - 2011
 Golden Grand Prix in Tbilisi - Bronze - 2011
 Golden Grand Prix Final in Baku - Silver - 2010
 African Championships in Cairo, Egypt - Gold - 2010
 Mediterranean Games in Istanbul, Turkey - Gold - 2010
 World Championship in  Guangzhou, China  Gold - 2006
 Mediterranean Games in Almeria - Gold - 2005
 David Cup in the USA - Gold - 2005
 All Arab Games in Algeria - Gold - 2004
 Grand Prix  Hungary - Gold - 2004
 Poland Open - 4th - 2003
 World Cup in Cairo - Gold - 2002
 World Championship in Moscow - Bronze - 2002
 Diamond Championship in Germany - Gold - 2002
 Ibraheem Mostafa in Alexandria - Gold - 2002
 Africa Championship in Cairo - Gold - 2002
 World Cup in France - Gold - 2001
 Ibraheem Mostafa in Cairo - Gold - 2001
 Mediterranea Games in Tunisia - Gold - 2001
 Russia Open in Moscow - 5th - 2001
 Africa Championship in Morocco - Gold - 2001
 Arab Championship in Syria - Gold - 2001
 Austria Open - Gold - 2001
 2000 Summer Olympics - 8th - 2000
 Russia Open in Mosccow - 5th - 2000
 African Championship in Tunisia - Gold - 2000
 Grand prix in Alexandria - Gold - 2000
 Grand prix Final in Italy - Bronze - 2000
 France Open in France - Bronze - 2000
 African Games in South Africa (Freestyle) - Gold - 1999
 African Games in South Africa - Gold - 1999
 Arab Games in Jordan - Gold - 1999
 King's Championship in Jordan - Gold - 1999
  Junior World Championship  in Cairo - Silver - 1998
 African Nations in Cairo - Gold - 1998
 Arab Junior Cup in Syria - Gold - 1997
 Arab Junior Cup in Cairo - Gold - 1996

External links and references

 
 Profile at FILA Wrestling Database
 https://web.archive.org/web/20170915234721/http://mohamedbogy.com/

1978 births
Olympic wrestlers of Egypt
Wrestlers at the 2000 Summer Olympics
Egyptian male sport wrestlers
Wrestlers at the 2004 Summer Olympics
Living people
Wrestlers at the 2012 Summer Olympics
World Wrestling Championships medalists
Mediterranean Games gold medalists for Egypt
Mediterranean Games medalists in wrestling
Competitors at the 2005 Mediterranean Games